Gregor Höll (26 June 1911 – 24 November 1999) was an Austrian skier. He competed at the 1932 Winter Olympics and the 1948 Winter Olympics.

Invalid ski jumping world record

 Not recognized. Crash at world record distance.

References

External links
 

1911 births
1999 deaths
Austrian male cross-country skiers
Austrian male Nordic combined skiers
Austrian male ski jumpers
Olympic cross-country skiers of Austria
Olympic Nordic combined skiers of Austria
Olympic ski jumpers of Austria
Cross-country skiers at the 1932 Winter Olympics
Nordic combined skiers at the 1932 Winter Olympics
Ski jumpers at the 1948 Winter Olympics
People from Bischofshofen
Sportspeople from Salzburg (state)
20th-century Austrian people